Afabet is a town in northern Eritrea.

Overview
Afabet is the capital of the Afabet district.

It is the site of the Battle of Afabet, which took place during the Eritrean War of Independence. The city is still surrounded by trenches, but has been largely rebuilt.

References

External links
Afabet, Eritrea

Populated places in Eritrea